Eleazor Holmes Ellis (August 26, 1826December 9, 1906) was an American lawyer and judge.  He was the 6th mayor of Green Bay, Wisconsin, and was a Wisconsin circuit court judge for seven years.

Family
Eleazor Holmes Ellis was born on his father's farm in what was later known as Preble, Wisconsin, now part of Green Bay, Wisconsin.  At the time of his birth, it was unorganized land of Brown County in what was then the Michigan Territory.  Eleazor and his siblings were some of the earliest colonist children born within the boundaries of what would become the state of Wisconsin. His father, Albert Gallatin Ellis, was the publisher of the Green Bay Intelligencer—the first newspaper published west of Lake Michigan.  Albert G. Ellis was also Mayor of Stevens Point, Wisconsin, at the same time that Eleazor was Mayor of Green Bay.

Eleazor's younger brother, Frederick S. Ellis, was also active in politics, serving in the Wisconsin State Assembly and Senate, and also later serving as Mayor of Green Bay.

Eleazor married three times and had a total of nine children. In 1850, Ellis married Harriet Sovina Gilbert. They had two children before she died in 1854.  Ellis then married Eliza D. Chappel in 1858. They had seven children before her death in 1878.  In 1881, he married Ruth K. Gillette.

Ellis died from old age in 1906 and was interred at Green Bay's Woodlawn Cemetery.

Career

Ellis studied law under Henry S. Baird, who had been Attorney General of the Wisconsin Territory.  He was admitted to practice law in the Wisconsin Territory at age 21, in 1847, and opened an office in Manitowoc. In 1851, he returned to Green Bay.  Over the next twenty years he was a successful lawyer in the city forming a series of partnerships—with William H. Norris, George G. Greene, Samuel D. Hastings, W. J. Green, and H. J. Fenbee.

Ellis was elected Wisconsin circuit court judge in 1871, without opposition, and served seven years, resigning in 1879 due to poor health and low wages.  He was an unsuccessful candidate for the Wisconsin Supreme Court in 1868 and 1891. Ellis served as Mayor of Green Bay in 1860. Later, he was Postmaster of Green Bay from 1896 to 1900 and Register of Deeds of Brown County, Wisconsin.

Electoral history

Wisconsin Supreme Court (1868)

| colspan="6" style="text-align:center;background-color: #e9e9e9;"| General Election, April 7, 1868

Wisconsin Supreme Court (1891)

| colspan="6" style="text-align:center;background-color: #e9e9e9;"| General Election, April 7, 1891

References

External links
 

People from Brown County, Wisconsin
Mayors of Green Bay, Wisconsin
Wisconsin lawyers
1826 births
1906 deaths
People from Manitowoc, Wisconsin
Wisconsin state court judges
Wisconsin Democrats